The 1997 BMW Open was an Association of Tennis Professionals men's tennis tournament held in Munich, Germany. The tournament was held from 28 April to 5 May 1997. Eighth-seeded Mark Philippoussis won the singles title.

Finals

Singles

 Mark Philippoussis defeated  Àlex Corretja 7–6(7–3), 1–6, 6–4
 It was Philippoussis's second title of the year and the fifth of his career

Doubles

 Pablo Albano /  Àlex Corretja defeated  Karsten Braasch /  Jens Knippschild 3–6, 7–5, 6–2
 It was Albano's first title of the year and the fifth of his career. It was Corretja's second title of the year and the fourth of his career

References

External links 
Association of Tennis Professionals (ATP) – tournament profile

 
BMW Open
Bavarian International Tennis Championships